Chartered IT Professional (in full, Chartered Information Technology Professional) denoted by CITP is a professional qualification awarded under Royal Charter to IT professionals who satisfy strict criteria  set by the British Computer Society (BCS), which is a professional body for IT in the United Kingdom.

Status
The title Chartered IT Professional is aligned with Skills Framework for the Information Age (SFIA), the UK Government backed competency framework, CITP is the benchmark of IT excellence and is terminal (final/top most) qualification in IT.

Criteria and requirements for chartered status in the UK have to be approved by the Privy Council and as such the CITP designation is on par with other chartered qualifications in other fields (such as the Chartered Accountant qualification awarded by the ICAEW).

CITP status is gaining increasing national and international recognition as the benchmark of excellence for IT professionals. It provides evidence of an individual’s commitment to their profession and endorsement of their experience and knowledge.

Eligibility
In order to qualify for this award a person normally needs to have at least 8 to 10 years professional experience in IT, with evidence of experience at a senior level (5) in the Skills Framework for the Information Age (SFIA), have passed a professional competency examination and successfully completed a skills assessment interview with two BCS assessors.

A fast track scheme exists for holders of Certified Architect and Certified IT Specialist certifications from The Open Group, which exempts applicants from the initial review and interview elements of the application process.

In order to maintain a certificate of current competence, demonstrable CPD must be undertaken.

Designatory lettering
Chartered IT Professionals are entitled to use the suffix CITP after their names.  This is written after honours, decorations and university degrees and before letters denoting membership of professional engineering institutions - for example: BSc (Hons) CITP MBCS.

The BCS maintains an online register of members with CITP status.

Licensing
Other Professional membership bodies apply to the BCS for a licence that enables them to award CITP to their eligible members.

Ireland
The Irish Computer Society is the awarding body of CITP status in Ireland. The standard has been developed in consultation with BCS and applicants undergo the same assessment process.

New Zealand
The Institute of IT Professionals New Zealand is licensed to award CITP status in New Zealand. The body extends the CITP standard to CITPNZ, incorporating additional requirements such as mandatory practicing certificate to retain the designation.

United Kingdom
The Institution of Engineering and Technology (IET) was the first membership body licensed to award CITP, but the agreement ended on 22 February 2020.

References

External links 
 Chartered IT Professional
 Chartered IT Professional Ireland - Irish Computer Society
 Chartered IT Professional New Zealand
 Institute of Chartered IT Professionals (South Africa)

British Computer Society
Information technology education
Information technology qualifications
Post-nominal letters
Titles in the United Kingdom
Professionals